Pompeo Balbani (died 1639) was a Roman Catholic prelate who served as Bishop of Castro del Lazio (1632–1639).

Biography
On 19 January 1632, Pompeo Balbani was appointed during the papacy of Pope Urban VIII as Bishop of Castro del Lazio.
On 25 January 1632, he was consecrated bishop by Luigi Caetani, Cardinal-Priest of Santa Pudenziana. 
He served as Bishop of Castro del Lazio until his death in 1639.

References 

17th-century Italian Roman Catholic bishops
Bishops appointed by Pope Urban VIII
1639 deaths